Roquetes may refer to:

 Les Roquetes, Barcelona, a neighbourhood of the city of Barcelona, Catalonia, Spain
 Roquetes (Barcelona Metro), a metro station
 Roquetes, Tarragona, a municipality in the province of Tarragona, Catalonia, Spain

See also
 Roquetas de Mar, a municipality of Almería province, Andalucía, Spain
 Roquettes, Haute-Garonne, France; a commune
 Roquette (disambiguation)
 Roquet (disambiguation)
 Rocket (disambiguation)